is a Japanese professional footballer who plays as a left back for J1 League club Urawa Red Diamonds.

Career statistics

Club
.

References

External links

Profile at Urawa Red Diamomds

2001 births
Living people
Japanese footballers
Association football defenders
J1 League players
Sagan Tosu players
Urawa Red Diamonds players
Sportspeople from Fukuoka Prefecture